Potsdam or Potsdam, the Fate of a Residence is a 1927 German silent drama film directed by Hans Behrendt and starring Christa Tordy, Hans Stüwe, and Camilla von Hollay.

The film's sets were designed by the art director Julius von Borsody.

Cast
Christa Tordy
Hans Stüwe
Camilla von Hollay
Hermine Sterler
Paul Otto
Mathias Wieman
Paul Bildt
Henry Bender
Antonie Jaeckel
Otto Kronburger

References

External links

Films of the Weimar Republic
German silent feature films
Films directed by Hans Behrendt
German black-and-white films
UFA GmbH films
1927 drama films
German drama films
Silent drama films
1920s German films